Mateus Lucena dos Santos (30 August 1994 – 28 November 2016), commonly known as Caramelo, was a Brazilian professional footballer who played for Chapecoense on loan from São Paulo FC as a right back.

Caramelo was one of the victims when LaMia Airlines Flight 2933 crashed on 28 November 2016.

Club career

Mogi Mirim
Born in Clementina, São Paulo, Caramelo joined Mogi Mirim's youth setup in 2009, aged 14. On 21 April 2013 he made his senior debut, starting in a 1–0 Campeonato Paulista home win against São Paulo.

Caramelo remained as a starter in the following two matches, a 6–0 routing of Botafogo-SP and a 1–1 draw against Santos, with his side being knocked out in the semifinals after a penalty shootout.

São Paulo
On 17 May 2013, Caramelo and Mogi teammate Roni signed with São Paulo. He made his Série A debut on 6 June, coming on as a second half substitute for Maicon in a 0–1 home loss against Goiás.

After returning from loan in January 2016, Caramelo was included in the main squad. Mainly used as a backup to Bruno, he was sent out on loan for the third time after the arrival of Julio Buffarini.

Atlético Goianiense (loan)
Rarely used by Tricolor in the previous campaign, Caramelo signed a one-year loan deal with Atlético Goianiense. A starter during the club's Campeonato Goiano winning campaign, he was demoted to second-choice during the year's Série B.

Caramelo's first professional goal came on 3 October 2014, in a 1–1 away draw against América Mineiro.

Chapecoense (loans)
In January 2015, Caramelo joined Chapecoense on loan until December. He was rarely used during his first spell at the club, being an immediate backup to starter Apodi.

On 5 August 2016, Caramelo returned to Chape also on loan, until the end of the year. Initially a second-choice to Gimenez, he overtook the latter in the final stages of the season.

Death
On 28 November 2016, whilst at the service of Chapecoense, Caramelo was among the fatalities of the LaMia Airlines Flight 2933 accident in the Colombian village of Cerro Gordo, La Unión, Antioquia.

Career statistics

Honours
Chapecoense
 Copa Sudamericana: 2016 (posthumously)

References

External links

1994 births
2016 deaths
Footballers from São Paulo (state)
Brazilian footballers
Association football defenders
Campeonato Brasileiro Série A players
Campeonato Brasileiro Série B players
Mogi Mirim Esporte Clube players
São Paulo FC players
Atlético Clube Goianiense players
Associação Chapecoense de Futebol players
Footballers killed in the LaMia Flight 2933 crash